Love Story is a compilation album by American pop singer Andy Williams that was released in the UK in July 1971 by the CBS Records division of Columbia and was mainly composed of tracks that had not been included on his studio LPs.

The compilation entered the UK album chart on July 31 of that year and reached number 11 over the course of 11 weeks.

The title track from the album, which was subtitled "Where Do I Begin?", entered the Hot 100 in the US in the issue of Billboard magazine dated February 6, 1971, and stayed on the chart for 13 weeks, eventually peaking at number nine.  The song also entered the magazine's list of the 40 most popular Easy Listening songs of the week in that same issue for its first of 15 weeks, later spending four weeks at number one and tying his previous record there, which was set by "Can't Get Used to Losing You" in 1963.  Its lifespan on the UK singles chart began on March 20 of that same year and lasted 18 weeks, during which time it reached number four.

Track listing

Side one
 "Someone Who Cares" from Fools (Alex Harvey) – 3:15
first released in the US in December 1971 on the 2-LP compilation The Impossible Dream
 "Long, Long Time" (Gary White) – 3:37
first released in the US in December 1971 on the 2-LP compilation The Impossible Dream
 "What Am I Living For" (Art Harris, Fred Jay) – 3:06
B-side of "A Woman's Way" (1969)
 "Whistling Away The Dark" from Darling Lili (Henry Mancini, Johnny Mercer) – 3:19
B-side of "Home Lovin' Man" (1970)
 "If You Could Read My Mind" (Gordon Lightfoot) – 3:52
first released in the US on the CD compilation B Sides and Rarities (2003)

Side two
 "I'll Be There" (Hal Davis, Berry Gordy, Willie Hutch, Bob West) – 2:39
first released in the US in August 1971 on the album You've Got a Friend 
 "He Ain't Heavy, He's My Brother" (Bob Russell, Bobby Scott) – 2:59
first released in the US in December 1971 on the 2-LP compilation The Impossible Dream
 "Autumn" from Cyrano (Richard Maltby, Jr., David Shire) – 2:19
first released in the US on the CD compilation B Sides and Rarities (2003) 
 "The Last Time I Saw Her" (Gordon Lightfoot) – 3:25
first released in the US in December 1971 on the 2-LP compilation The Impossible Dream
 "(Where Do I Begin) Love Story" (Francis Lai, Carl Sigman) – 3:10

Recording dates

February 10, 1965 – "Autumn"
September 17, 1969 – "What Am I Living For"
July 28, 1970 – "Whistling Away the Dark"
December 17, 1970 – "Someone Who Cares", "(Where Do I Begin) Love Story"
April 22, 1971 – "I'll Be There", "The Last Time I Saw Her"
April 22, 1971 – April 26, 1971 – "Long, Long Time", "If You Could Read My Mind", "He Ain't Heavy, He's My Brother"

Song information

Kenny Rogers and the First Edition recorded "Someone Who Cares" for the 1970 film Fools and reached number four on Billboard magazine's Easy Listening chart and number 51 on the Hot 100. "Long, Long Time" by Linda Ronstadt reached number 25 on the Hot 100 and number 20 Easy Listening. Chuck Willis had a number one R&B hit in Billboard magazine with "What Am I Living For",   which also reached number nine on the pop chart.  "Whistling Away The Dark" comes from the 1970 film Darling Lili, where it was sung by the film's star, Julie Andrews. "If You Could Read My Mind" by Gordon Lightfoot peaked at number five on the Hot 100, spent a week at number one Easy Listening, and reached number 30 on the UK singles chart.
  
The Jackson 5 song "I'll Be There" had five weeks at number one on the Hot 100 and six weeks at number one R&B and reached number 24 Easy Listening and number four UK. By the time of this release by Williams, The Hollies had made it to number three on the UK singles chart and number seven pop with "He Ain't Heavy, He's My Brother", and Neil Diamond took his rendition of the song to number 20 pop and number four Easy Listening. "Autumn" originated in the 1958 musical Cyrano and was recorded by Barbra Streisand in 1964 for her album People. Glen Campbell's recording of "The Last Time I Saw Her" reached number 61 on the Hot 100, number 12 Easy Listening, and number 21 Country.

References

Bibliography

1971 albums
Andy Williams albums
Columbia Records albums